Kim Jong-Kun (김종건, born May 10, 1969 in South Korea) is a South Korean former footballer.

Player career 
 1994-2001 : Hyundai Horangi / Ulsan Hyundai Horangi

Honours 
 Club
 K-League winners : 1996
 Player
 K-League Cup : Top Scorer (1998, 1999)
 Korean FA Cup : Top Scorer (1998)

References

External links 
 

Living people
K League 1 players
Ulsan Hyundai FC players
1969 births
South Korean footballers
Association football forwards